The Ora Ballet Cat is a battery electric compact hatchback produced by Chinese EV manufacturer ORA, a marque of Great Wall Motors since 2022.

Overview
The Ora Ballet Cat was previewed by the Ora Punk Cat concept at Auto Shanghai on April 21, 2021 in Shanghai, China, alongside the Ora Lightning Cat. Its styling is controversial as the car heavily resembles the Type 1 Volkswagen Beetle.

In August, a slightly revised variant of the Punk Cat called the Ballet Cat was revealed as the production version. This version is marketed towards the female car buyer demographic. Later that month, a WEY-branded version of the Punk Cat called the V72 was revealed. It features a large chrome grille and a larger trunk. When revealed at Auto Guangzhou on November 19, 2021 the V72 was officially revealed as the WEY Dream.

The ORA Ballet Cat is equipped with a 126-kW (171 hp) motor on the front axle, with the top speed limited to 155 km/h. The Ballet Cat could be had with a LFP battery for 49.92 kWh supporting a CLTC range of 401 km or a LFP battery for 60.5 kWh supporting a CLTC range of 500 km. The entry level trim level is called the "Alice Edition", equipped with a 49.92-kWh battery for 401 km of CLTC range. Additionally, ORA-Pilot L2 autonomous driving system with ACC is also standard with the price being 193,000 RMB (28,700 USD). The middle trim level is called the "Nutcracker Edition" priced at 203,000 RMB (30,190 USD), equipped with the same 49.92-kWh battery while adding heated front seats and self-parking system. The semi-top trim level, the "Sleeping Beauty Edition", costing 213,000 RMB (31,675 USD) is equipped with the 60.5-kWh battery supporting 500 km of CLTC range but lacks heated seats and a self-parking system. The top trim level of the ORA Ballet Cat is called "Swan Lake Edition". The Swan Lake Edition is equipped with the 60.5-kWh battery with all the options for 223,000 RMB (33,160 USD).

References

Upcoming car models
Hatchbacks
Cars of China
Cars introduced in 2022
Retro-style automobiles